Macromphalina paradoxa is a species of very small sea snail, a marine gastropod mollusk in the family Vanikoridae.

Distribution

Description 
The maximum recorded shell length is 2.3 mm.

Habitat 
Minimum recorded depth is 20 m. Maximum recorded depth is 56 m.

References

Vanikoridae
Gastropods described in 1998